The Comandante Fontoura is a river in the state of Mato Grosso, Brazil, a right tributary of the Xingu River. It starts in the Serra do Roncador, in the Maraiwatsede Indigenous Territory. It flows northwards and meets the Xingu River at the border of Mato Grosso and Pará.

The river is named after Otávio Gusmão de Fontoura who explored its basin in 1913.

References

Rivers of Mato Grosso
Rivers of Pará